The Chubu Open is a golf tournament in the Chūbu region of Japan. It was first played in 1971, and was an event on the Japan Golf Tour from 1973 to 1991.

Winners
2021 Kinihiro Kamii
2020 Cancelled due to the COVID-19 pandemic
2019 Kazuki Ishiwata
2018 Daiki Imano (amateur)
2017 Masatsugu Fujishima
2016 Keisuke Kondo
2015 Daiki Imano (amateur)
2014 Shota Kishimoto
2013 Keisuke Kondo
2012 Takaya Onoda (amateur)
2011 Tatsuya Tanioka
2010 Kotaro Kajimoto
2009 Junpei Takayama
2008 Kunihiro Komii
2007 Hiro Aoyama
2006 Yosuke Uraguchi
2005 Hisashi Sawada
2004 Yosuke Uraguchi
2003 Keishiro Nakata
2002 Takeru Shibata
2001 Masashi Shimada
2000 Shoichi Yamamoto
1999 Eiji Mizoguchi
1998 Toshio Ozaki
1997 Junji Kawase
1996 Shoichi Yamamoto
1995 Junji Kawase
1994 Eiji Mizoguchi
1993 Junji Kawase
1992 Naoya Sugiyama
1991 Teruo Nakamura
1990 Hatsutoshi Sakai
1989 Tadao Nakamura
1988 Teruo Nakamura
1987 Eitaro Deguchi
1986 Eitaro Deguchi
1985 Masahiro Shiota
1984 Teruo Suzumura
1983 Teruo Nakamura
1982 Shigeru Uchida
1981 Shigeru Uchida
1980 Hisashi Suzumura
1979 Kanaichi Matsuoka
1978 Kouichi Inoue
1977 Hiroshi Ishii
1976 Chen Chien-chin
1975 Hideo Noguchi
1974 Tadashi Kitta
1973 Hiroshi Ishii
1972 Tadashi Kitta
1971 Shigeru Uchida

External links
Chubu Golf Federation
Coverage on Japan Golf Tour's official site

Golf tournaments in Japan
Former Japan Golf Tour events
Recurring sporting events established in 1971